Abdul Rahman Orfalli was an anti-government organizer during the current Syrian uprising, who played a principal role in organizing the original demonstrations in March 2011. 
On March 20, 2012, he was reported to have been killed in heavy shelling by the Syrian army in an offensive on Homs.

The Homs Coordination Committee said heavy shelling killed Orfalli, 23.
He had been arrested twice and tortured during a five-month detainment before returning to Homs to lead anti-government violence, the group said.

References

1989 births
2012 deaths
People from Homs
Syrian prisoners and detainees
Prisoners and detainees of Syria
Syrian torture victims
People killed in the Syrian civil war